Solberg Sportsklubb is a Norwegian sports club from Solbergelva which was founded in 1929. The club has sections for football, bandy, handball and gymnastics.

Its local rivals are Mjøndalen and Birkebeineren.

Bandy section
Solberg play in the Norwegian Bandy Premier League, have won the national championships several times and lost the final in 2016.

Football section

The football team plays in the Third Division, the fourth tier of Norwegian football. In 1952, the club made it to the Norwegian championship final-game.

References

External links
Official site 

Bandy clubs in Norway
Football clubs in Norway
Sport in Buskerud
Association football clubs established in 1929
Bandy clubs established in 1929
Sports clubs established in 1929
1929 establishments in Norway